Feivel is a Yiddish-language masculine given name.

Notable people with the name include:
Yechezkel Feivel (1755–1833), rabbi and writer
Feivel Gruberger (1927–2013), American rabbi
Shraga Feivel Cohen (died 2022), American rabbi
Shraga Feivel Mendlowitz (1886–1948), rabbi
Shraga Feivel Paretzky (1917–1992), rabbi
Feivel Schiffer (1809–1871), Polish poet and writer
Shraga Feivel Zimmerman (living), rabbi

Yiddish masculine given names